Enrico Kern (born 12 March 1979) is a German football coach and former player. He worked as manager for FC Erzgebirge Aue U19.

Career
Born in Schneeberg, Kern began his football career as a youth player with FC Erzgebirge Aue before moving to Tennis Borussia Berlin for DM1 million in the summer of 1998. He then moved between many clubs including; LASK in Austria and SSV Jahn Regensburg before moving to Rostock in 2006. After Rostock was relegated in 2010, he transferred back to FC Erzgebirge Aue.

References

External links
 
 

1979 births
Living people
People from Schneeberg, Saxony
German footballers
Footballers from Saxony
Association football forwards
Germany B international footballers
Germany under-21 international footballers
Germany youth international footballers
Bundesliga players
2. Bundesliga players
FC Erzgebirge Aue players
Tennis Borussia Berlin players
SV Werder Bremen II players
SV Waldhof Mannheim players
LASK players
SSV Jahn Regensburg players
FC Hansa Rostock players
German expatriate footballers
German expatriate sportspeople in Austria
Expatriate footballers in Austria